Thomas Clap Perkins (July 29, 1798 – October 11, 1870) was an American lawyer and politician.

Perkins was born in Hartford, Connecticut., July 29, 1798. His father was Enoch Perkins, Esq, of Hartford, and his mother, Anna Pitkin, was a daughter of Rev. Timothy Pitkin, of Farmington, Connecticut. His brother was Rev. George W. Perkins.  He graduated from Yale College in 1818. After graduation, he studied law with Seth P. Staples, Esq, in New Haven, and in 1820 was admitted to the bar in Hartford, where he practiced his profession for half a century, with distinguished success.  He joined the law firm founded by his father in 1786, now called Howard, Kohn, Sprague & FitzGerald, one of the oldest continuously practicing law firms in the US. He was several times elected to the Connecticut State Senate and Connecticut House of Representatives, and was once elected a Judge of the Connecticut Supreme Court, but declined the position. He also served as the United States attorney for the district of Connecticut. He died in Hartford, Oct. 11, 1870, at the age of 72.

Perkins married in 1827 Mary, daughter of the Rev Lyman Beecher, D.D. and sister of author Harriet Beecher Stowe. She survived him, with two sons and two daughters.  His eldest son was Frederic Beecher Perkins, father of author Charlotte Perkins Gilman.  His other son Charles E. Perkins joined his father's law firm and became friend and lawyer to author Mark Twain.

He's is the brother of Emily Perkins Baldwin, the wife of Connecticut Governor and US Senator Roger Sherman Baldwin, the mother of Connecticut Governor and Chief Justice Simeon E. Baldwin, the grandmother of New York Supreme Court Justice Edward Baldwin Whitney and aunt of Charlotte Perkins Gilman.

References

External links
 Memorials of Connecticut Judges and Attorneys
 

1798 births
1870 deaths
Lawyers from Hartford, Connecticut
Connecticut lawyers
Yale University alumni
Connecticut state senators
Members of the Connecticut House of Representatives
19th-century American politicians
Beecher family
Politicians from Hartford, Connecticut
19th-century American lawyers